Ali Nashid (Ogaru Ayya) is a Maldivian professional football manager.

Career
In November 2013 he became the new caretaker coach of the Maldives national football team.  In March 2014 has been changed by Drago Mamić.

References

External links
Maldives (2013) | National Football Teams

Year of birth missing (living people)
Living people
Maldivian football managers
Maldives national football team managers
Place of birth missing (living people)